Charles Edward "Buzz" Wetzel (August 25, 1894 – March 7, 1941) was a pitcher in Major League Baseball who played briefly for the Philadelphia Athletics during the  season. He was born in Jay, Oklahoma.

Wetzel was 32 years old when he entered the majors on July 27, 1927, and did not have a decision or strikeouts. Wetzel posted a 7.71 earned run average in two games, including one start, giving up four earned runs on eight hits and five walks in  innings of work. As a hitter, he went 1-for-1 with a run scored. He pitched his final game on July 28, and never appeared in a major league game again.

Following his majors career, Wetzel pitched and managed in the minor leagues. 
Wetzel died in Globe, Arizona, at the age of 46.

External links

Retrosheet

Philadelphia Athletics players
Major League Baseball pitchers
Minor league baseball managers
Baseball players from Oklahoma
People from Delaware County, Oklahoma
1894 births
1941 deaths
Marion Senators players